"I Belong to You" is a song by American rock musician Lenny Kravitz from his fifth studio album 5 (1998). It was written and produced by Kravitz and released as the album's third single in August 1998. The song features a soft rock and reggae-inspired sound.

Reception
Carla Hay of AXS stated, "This calypso-inspired rock/pop ballad is all kinds of laid-back and sexy. One of the singles from Kravitz’s 1998 album, 5, “I Belong to You” is one of his most sensual songs."

Track listing
The single featured several remixes for his previous single "If You Can't Say No", apart from the "I Belong to You" song.

 "I Belong to You" – 4:17
 "If You Can't Say No" (Flunky in the Attic Mix) – 5:16
 "If You Can't Say No" (Just Say No Mix) – 6:00
 "If You Can't Say No" (BT Twilo Dub) – 8:02
 "If You Can't Say No" (Dallas Austin Mix) – 4:45

UK edition
 "I Belong to You" – 4:17
 "If You Can't Say No" (Flunky in the Attic Mix) – 5:16
 "If You Can't Say No" (BT Twilo Dub) – 8:02

Charts

Music video

The music video was directed by Mark Seliger and Fred Woodward. It is set in the Bahamas, from where the family of his mother, Roxie Roker hailed. It visually expanded the reggae influence of the song. Kravitz was filmed singing and dancing among the people, also walking and biking along the streets. Another scene from the video features Kravitz singing while submerged up to his stomach in the ocean.

Personnel
All instruments and vocals performed by Lenny Kravitz, except the toy piano, performed by Terry Manning.

The Flunky in the Attic Mix was mixed by Billy Corgan, lead singer of The Smashing Pumpkins.

References

1998 singles
Lenny Kravitz songs
American reggae songs
Reggae fusion songs
Song recordings produced by Lenny Kravitz
Songs written by Lenny Kravitz
Virgin Records singles